Santa María Alotepec is a town and municipality in Oaxaca in south-western Mexico. It is part of the Sierra Mixe district within the Sierra Norte de Oaxaca region.

Name
The name Alotepec means "hill of the macaws".

Geography
Trees include pine, oak and cedars. Fruits include orange, banana, mamey sapote, sapodilla, mango, lime, custard apple and avocado. Wild animals include foxes, deer, armadillo, tepescuincle, wild boar and anteater. There is a great variety of butterflies.

In 2005, the municipality had 682 households with a total population of 2,526 of whom 2,262 spoke an indigenous language. 90% of the population were engaged in agriculture. A few also keep domestic animals.

The Union of Indigenous Communities of the Isthmus Region, a co-operative founded in 1982, assists in the production and distribution of local products, notably coffee, under a fair trade label.

References

Municipalities of Oaxaca